Lukáš Vomela (born September 25, 1985) is a Czech former professional ice hockey defenceman.

Vomela was drafted 248th overall by the Dallas Stars in the 2004 NHL Entry Draft. He played a total of 23 games in the Czech Extraliga, playing for HC České Budějovice, HC Slavia Praha and HC Sparta Praha.

Vomela played in the 2003 IIHF World U18 Championships for the Czech Republic.

Career statistics

Regular season and playoffs

International

References

External links

1985 births
Living people
Czech ice hockey defencemen
Dallas Stars draft picks
Motor České Budějovice players
LHK Jestřábi Prostějov players
KLH Vajgar Jindřichův Hradec players
IHC Písek players
HC Slavia Praha players
SK Horácká Slavia Třebíč players
HC Sparta Praha players
Sportspeople from České Budějovice
HC Tábor players
HC Vrchlabí players